John F. Kennedy  is one of the  37 public high schools in the Cleveland Metropolitan School District. The school first opened in 1965. The current enrollment is under 700. The mascot is the Eagle and the school colors are red, white and blue. John F. Kennedy is a comprehensive high schools that offers Advance Placement, Honors, Early College, Career and Technical Classes and JROTC The school offers a variety of activities, including baseball, basketball, football, track and field, and wrestling.

Community

John F. Kennedy High School is located in the Lee-Havard neighborhood on the southeast of Cleveland. Nearby is a library and shopping center.

Ohio High School Athletic Association State Championships

 Track - 1969

External links

References

Education in Cleveland
High schools in Cuyahoga County, Ohio
Educational institutions established in 1966
Public high schools in Ohio
1966 establishments in Ohio
Cleveland Metropolitan School District
Monuments and memorials to John F. Kennedy in the United States